The sexual abuse scandal in the Chicago archdiocese in the late 20th and early 21st century is a major chapter in the series of Catholic sex abuse cases in the United States and Ireland.

Role of Joseph Bernardin 
Archbishop Joseph Bernardin (1928–1996) was among the first U.S. cardinals or bishops to confront the issue of sexual abuse by clergy. He adopted a strong stance on sexual abuse cases within the clergy by implementing the strongest, most comprehensive policy concerning priests accused of sexual misconduct with minors. Bernardin's reforms concerning this issue soon served as a model for other dioceses across the nation. In 1992 the archdiocese started one of the first programs in the country for victims' assistance.

Bernardin was personally accused of sexual misconduct, but his accuser later recanted his testimony. Former seminarian Stephen Cook claimed to have been abused by Bernardin and another priest in the 1970s. But Cook subsequently dropped Bernardin from his lawsuit, as he was no longer certain that his memories (which had emerged while he was under hypnosis) were accurate.

Scandal under Cardinal George (1997–2014) 
Prior to the election of Pope Benedict XVI, Cardinal George had spoken with then Cardinal Ratzinger and asked for his assistance in the matter of sexual abuse by clergy. After the election of Benedict XVI, the new Pope told Cardinal George that he remembered their previous conversation and that he would attend to the matter.

While Cardinal George has had to deal with the fallout from clergy sexual abuse cases from many years ago, he has come under fire for his actions during a recent abuse case. Cardinal George took some responsibility for the affair, saying, "The sins of priests and bishops destroy the Church, and I think that's what we're seeing here."

McCormack affair
Rev. Daniel McCormack allegedly had abused two boys repeatedly from 2001 to 2005. Cardinal George has faced criticism for allowing McCormack to remain at his post after allegations first surfaced in August 2005. George has acknowledged that he had made mistakes in the case of the Rev. McCormack, who was charged with two counts of aggravated criminal sexual abuse on January 21, 2006.

At the time prosecutors were not able to move forward because they did not have sufficient evidence against him.  McCormack was instructed not to have any unsupervised contact with minors and a personal monitor was assigned to him. Cardinal George has since said that, had he known several months ago what he knew now that he would have removed McCormack from his duties right away.

Despite claims of following the Church's procedures for dealing with child-molesting priests, diocesan authorities made no attempt to contact the police regarding McCormack. Following this incident, the procedures for reporting abuse in Chicago were reportedly reevaluated by a panel and their importance was stressed.

Under Cardinal Cupich (2014–present)
Archbishop Cupich, who had been bishop of the Diocese of Rapid City, South Dakota and later of the Diocese of Spokane, Washington, had supported a zero-tolerance policy to control abuses in the church. He believed that ordained and lay Catholics who engaged in any kind of sex abuse of minors- or those applying to ministry who were found to have done so- should be prohibited from ministry with children. He also said that authorities should be notified for investigation. He also proposed a policy to deal with cases that are revealed through the sacrament of confession and Penance (where nothing at all can ordinarily be disclosed without very, very special procedures). In August 2015, he acted to suspend (remove faculties to perform the Sacraments) Octavio Munoz Capetillo, the Pastor of Saint Pancratius Parish, from all duties because of allegations against him, and to notify and cooperate with the authorities.

All allegations made to the archdiocese of past or present conduct are reported to the Illinois States Attorney's office and, if involving a current minor, to the Illinois Department of Children and Family Services. Of these allegations, the archdiocese investigates only matters involving current priests, from the standpoint of evaluating for removal from the priesthood. All priests, employees and volunteers go through background checks every three years. They are  trained in identifying suspected abuse tand in reporting requirements to authorities.  identifying and reporting requirements to the authorities for suspected abuse. Children in the diocese schools and study classes receive age-appropriate training, according to the diocese. According to John O'Malley, archdiocese special counsel, "he believes the archdiocese has reported every new case of sexual abuse to authorities since 2002 and provided files of older allegations going back decades."

In response to the McCarrick-Vigano controversy, the Pope called a bishops’ conference on abuse scheduled for 2019 and appointed Cardinal Cupich to the organizing committee. In December 2018 the Attorney General of Illinois, who launched an investigation in summer 2018 following reporting of the Grand jury investigation of Catholic Church sexual abuse in Pennsylvania, issued a preliminary report. She stated having found evidence that allegations of sexual abuse by some 500 priests in the six dioceses in Illinois, including the archdiocese, had not been properly investigated by the dioceses. According to the archdiocese, since 2002, it has reported to authorities all claims, whether or not it investigated them, at the time the claims were made.

Prior to the Attorney General's investigation, only the archdiocese and the Diocese of Joliet had previously published any names of priests with credible complaints against them. In response to the state AG's investigation, the archdiocese reversed a previous decision by Cardinal George and released 10 more names to its public list.

In March 2019, lawyers for sex abuse victims revealed that 22 names were added to the list of 77 accused Catholic clergy, bringing the total number of accused clergy to 99. The Archdiocese acknowledged that names released by the lawyers were credible, with 20 of these 22 new names already reported to civil authorities by the Archdiocese.

In January 2021, prominent South Side priest Father Michael Pfleger was suspended after being accused of sexual abuse of two minors. After an investigation by the Archdiocese, he was reinstated to parish ministry in May of the same year. The Chicago Tribune reported that the Archdiocese "concluded that there is insufficient reason to suspect Father Pfleger is guilty of these allegations."

References

Chicago
Roman Catholic Archdiocese of Chicago
Crime in Chicago
Incidents of violence against boys